John Sitting Bull ( – June 10, 1955), farmer, circus performer and actor, stepson of Sitting Bull.

Biography 
John Sitting Bull was a son of Bear Louse and of Seen-by-her-Nation-woman. He was born  on the northern Great Plains region of the United States. His native name was Refuses-them (Lakota: Nurcan). He was a deaf mute. Upon his father's death his mother remarried to Hunkpapa chief Sitting Bull who adopted him.

After his stepfather's surrender with 186 members of his family and followers to the United States on July 19, 1881, the band was detained as prisoners of war for two years at Fort Randall in Dakota Territory. They were allowed in May 1883 to rejoin the rest of the Hunkpapa Lakota band at Standing Rock Reservation. After the murder of Sitting Bull on December 15, 1890, the surviving immediate family relocated in early 1891 to Pine Ridge Indian Reservation settling in the White Clay district.

John Sitting Bull was a performer in Buffalo Bill's Wild West touring for several years the United States and Canada. In the 1950s towards the end of his life he acted in bit roles in several Hollywood movies, such as "Tomahawk" (1951), "The Savage" (1952) and "Chief Crazy Horse" (1955).

John Sitting Bull was extensively interviewed by artist David Humphreys Miller in the 1940s who also painted several portraits of him. In his book “Ghost Dance” (1959, Duell, Sloane & Pearce, New York) David Humphreys Miller claimed that it was John Sitting Bull who had accidentally discharged a rifle when soldiers of the 7th cavalry attempted to disarm the fugitive Lakota under chief Spotted Elk (Big Foot) that resulted in the Wounded Knee Massacre. However, most historians disagree.

When not touring with the circus, John Sitting Bull primarily lived with his niece, Angelina LaPointe on Pine Ridge Reservation in South Dakota. He died in Rapid City, South Dakota on June 10, 1955

References 

1867 births
1955 deaths
Native American people
Lakota people
Hunkpapa people
Native American people of the Indian Wars
Battle of the Little Bighorn
Massacres of Native Americans
Native American genocide